State Road 136 (NM 136) is a , paved, four-lane, divided state highway in Doña Ana County in the U.S. state of New Mexico. It travels largely south-to-north. NM 136 is an important connecting road between the border and Interstate 10 (I-10).

The southern terminus of NM 136 is at the Santa Teresa Port of Entry on the Mexican border. The northern terminus is in Santa Teresa at the Texas state line. The road continues as State Highway 178 (SH 178) in Texas.

Route description

The highway begins at the Santa Teresa Port of Entry on the Mexican border. The road heads north through the Chihuahuan Desert and after about  intersects with Doña Ana County Road A003, connecting to NM 9. Continuing north, NM 136 crosses the railroad tracks of the Union Pacific Railway south of intersection with Airport Road which provides access to the Doña Ana County Airport, Union Pacific Santa Teresa Facility, and War Eagles Museum. After passing by the airport, the highway turns east and enters Santa Teresa where it intersects with NM 273. Continuing east the road reaches its northern terminus at the Texas state line.

History
The original Route 136 was established in mid-1930s as a replacement for Route 106 connecting New Mexico and Colorado, northwest of Chama. This road became U.S. Route 84 (US 84) in the early 1940s.

NM 136 was approved and built by the New Mexico State Highway Commission concurrently with SH 178 and Santa Teresa Port of Entry in 1988-1990, and officially opened in 1991. Santa Teresa Port of Entry was opened in 1992 and was designed to alleviate cross-border traffic through other border crossings in central El Paso. Both NM 136 and SH 178 were built to accommodate heavy tractor-trailers and provide ready access to I-10 northwest of El Paso.

Leroy Sandoval, former Transportation Planning Division Director, appeared before the New Mexico State Highway Commission and requested the Commission designate NM 136 as the Pete V. Domenici International Highway in honor of New Mexico senator Pete Domenici. The State Highway Commission concurred and approved the designation of NM 136 as the Pete V. Domenici International Highway on May 14, 1998, and appropriated $16,000 to erect signs for the new road name.

Major intersections

See also

 List of state roads in New Mexico

References

External links

 

136
Transportation in Doña Ana County, New Mexico